Dieter Krassnig (born 3 August 1973) is an Austrian snowboarder. He competed at the 1998 Winter Olympics, the 2002 Winter Olympics and the 2006 Winter Olympics.

References

1973 births
Living people
Austrian male snowboarders
Olympic snowboarders of Austria
Snowboarders at the 1998 Winter Olympics
Snowboarders at the 2002 Winter Olympics
Snowboarders at the 2006 Winter Olympics
Sportspeople from Klagenfurt
21st-century Austrian people